Aphaenogaster reichelae is a species of ant discovered and described by S. O. Shattuck in 2008.

References

reichelae
Insects described in 2008